The Worshipful Company of Chartered Architects is one of the Livery Companies of the City of London.

The company was established in 1984 and was granted Livery status in 1988. The Company promotes architecture in the City of London particularly - primarily through its annual New City Architecture Award. This is made to the building which is deemed to make the most significant contribution to the streetscape and skyline of the City of London in the qualifying period. It also supports architectural scholarship by awarding an annual student travel award, student drawing prizes and prizes for art at the four City of London Schools. It also supports a range of other charities which are related to the city.

While all Livery Companies are expected to have links to civil organisations or the armed forces, the Chartered Architects have established links with the Orpington Sea Cadets.

The Company ranks ninety-eighth in the order of precedence for Livery Companies, its motto is Firmnesse, Commodite, Delyte, and its Church is St Lawrence Jewry

References

External links
http://architectscompany.org/

Architects
1984 establishments in England